Iva Sidash also Yana Sidash (born June 30, 1995, Lviv, Ukraine) is a Ukrainian street and documentary photographer.

Biography 
She has been engaged in photography since 2019. In 2022 graduated from the Visual Storytelling ICP masterclass. Has been covering a full-scale Russian invasion of Ukraine in 2022. Works are published in Financial Times, Der Spiegel, Göteborgs-Posten, Fisheye Magazine, Ukraїner, Bird in Flight", Reporters, The Village Ukraine, The Village Ukraine, Untitled, Prostranstvo.media.

Awards 
 Finalist of the International Fujifilm Moment Street Photo Awards 2021
 Scholarship for ICP/CAMERA Masterclass held in Italy 2022
 Top 3 best projects completed at ICP/CAMERA Masterclass 2022

Exhibitions

Group exhibitions 
 2023 – Fisheye Gallery - “Alarming Beauty” Paris, France
 2023 – Centrum för fotografi: CFF - “Invasion” Stockholm, Sweden
 2023 – Hémisphères Paris - “Ukraine” Paris, France
 2023 – Taller 131 - “Nostalgia De Una Rutina Interrumpida” Barcelona, Spain
 2022, 2023 – Zimmer 48 - “Ukraine. Resilience"” Berlin, Germany
 2022 – Praxis Gallery “Ukraine: Portraits Of Courage” Minneapolis, United States
 2022 – The International Convention Center "Ukrainian House" - “Flash. Ukrainian photography today” Kyiv, Ukraine
 2022 – Lviv Historical Museum “Chorna rillya izorana” Lviv, Ukraine
 2021 – Lviv Municipal Art Center “Street Dialogues 2.0” Lviv Ukraine
 2021 – Odesa Photo Days Festival “Street dialogues” Odesa, Ukraine

References

External links
 Official website
 , Media Topos, 20.12.2021.

1995 births
Living people
People from Lviv
War photographers
21st-century Ukrainian people
21st-century photographers
War correspondents of the Russo-Ukrainian War
Ukrainian photographers
Ukrainian women photographers